Sphaeroma quadridentatum, the sea pill bug, is a species of isopod in the family Sphaeromatidae.

References

External links

 

Sphaeromatidae
Articles created by Qbugbot
Crustaceans described in 1818